Anisolophia cultrifera is a species of longhorn beetles of the subfamily Lamiinae. It was described by White in 1855, and is known from Brazil.

References

Beetles described in 1855
Endemic fauna of Brazil
Acanthocinini